Wild Peony Press was a Sydney-based independent press, dedicated to fostering the better understanding of Asian cultures in English-speaking countries. Co-founded by Mabel Lee, Wild Peony Press was active between 1984 and 2009 and their work was hailed as " an important move against cultural parochialism" in Australia.  From 1991, University of Hawai'i Press undertook international distribution. Initially publishing language textbooks, Wild Peony later focused on literature and culture, including the University of Sydney East Asian Series and World Literature Series. Wild Peony published literary anthologies,  the autobiographies of Mitsuharu Kaneko (in the translation of A. R. Davis),  Liu Wei-ping and Stanley Hunt, a study of artist Wang Lan (Chinese-Australian artist), poetry by Ouyang Yu, Zijie Pan and Subhash Jaireth, translations of Arakawa Toyozo, Junko Takamizawa (a biography of Hideo Kobayashi), Jun'ichirō Tanizaki, Nishiwaki Junzaburo, Yi Chung-hwan, Kyunyeo, Xu Xing (writer), Yang Lian, Hong Ying and Zhai Yongming and papers from the conferences of the International Comparative Literature Association. Lee, a translator and friend of Gao Xingjian, used his ink paintings for several of the Wild Peony covers.

References 

Companies based in Sydney
Companies established in the 20th century